Ellen Dougherty (20 September 1844 – 3 November 1919), a New Zealand nurse, was the first Registered Nurse in the world.

Biography 
Ellen Dougherty was born at Cutters Bay, Port Underwood, New Zealand. Ellen was inspired to be a nurse after learning about Florence Nightingale. It is believed that before nurse training, she worked with Charles Barraud in his Wellington pharmacy. She trained at Wellington Hospital from 1885 and completed a certificate in nursing in 1887. In 1893 she accepted the post of matron of the newly opened Palmerston North Hospital. In 1899 she was formally registered as a pharmacist.

In 1901, New Zealand became the first country to pass legislation, the Nurses Registration Act, on the registration of nurses. Dougherty was then the first to be registered on 10 January 1902. She retired in 1908.

Dougherty is buried at Clareville Cemetery, Carterton, New Zealand. Her medal is at the Nurses Chapel at Wellington Hospital. For the centenary of Nursing, it was arranged with Nursing Council in Wellington that her grave be restored, and on the anniversary of 10 January 2002, the grave was rededicated with family, historians and media attending.

The UK began nurse registration in 1919, the year Ellen Dougherty died.

References

Further reading
 Macgregor, Miriam (1975) Petticoat pioneers; North Island women of the colonial era Book 2 - cited in Dictionary of New Zealand Biography

External links
Openshaw, M. G. Dougherty, Ellen 1844 - 1919.  Dictionary of New Zealand Biography, updated March 2006

1844 births
1919 deaths
New Zealand nurses
People from Palmerston North
Burials at Clareville Cemetery
19th-century New Zealand people
New Zealand women nurses